Vaughan Promontory is a high, rugged ice-covered promontory which extends eastward from Holland Range between Ekblad and Morton Glaciers. It terminates in Cape Maude overlooking Ross Ice Shelf. Named by Advisory Committee on Antarctic Names (US-ACAN) for Commander V.J. Vaughan, U.S. Navy, commanding officer of USS Glacier during Operation Deepfreeze 1964 and 1965.

Promontories of Antarctica
Shackleton Coast